Pablo Sáinz Villegas (born 16 June 1977) is a Spanish classical guitarist. He was born in Logroño in La Rioja Province and began his musical studies there before going on to an international career. Among his awards was the 2008 Critical Eye Award in classical music. In 2018, he was signed by the Sony Classical label. His first recording for Sony was Volver with Plácido Domingo, a collection of Iberian and Latin American songs. The production also involved arranger conductor and pianist Nazareno Andorno. Villegas has been based in New York City since 2001.

Discography
 2004: “Guitar Recital” 
 2013: “Historie du Tango”
 2015: “Americano”
 2018: “Volver” – with Placido Domingo (Sony Classical)
 2020: “Soul of Spanish Guitar” (Sony Classical)

References

External links

 
 Artist's page at Columbia Artists Management

Spanish classical guitarists
Spanish male guitarists
1977 births
Living people
21st-century guitarists
21st-century male musicians